Bad Ems-Nassau is a Verbandsgemeinde ("collective municipality") in the Rhein-Lahn-Kreis, in Rhineland-Palatinate, Germany. The seat of the Verbandsgemeinde is in Bad Ems. It was formed on 1. January 2019 by the merger of the former Verbandsgemeinden Bad Ems and Nassau.

The Verbandsgemeinde Bad Ems-Nassau consists of the following Ortsgemeinden ("local municipalities"):

 Arzbach 
 Attenhausen 
 Bad Ems
 Becheln
 Dausenau 
 Dessighofen 
 Dienethal 
 Dornholzhausen 
 Fachbach 
 Frücht 
 Geisig 
 Hömberg 
 Kemmenau 
 Lollschied 
 Miellen 
 Misselberg 
 Nievern
 Nassau
 Obernhof
 Oberwies 
 Pohl
 Schweighausen 
 Seelbach 
 Singhofen 
 Sulzbach 
 Weinähr 
 Winden
 Zimmerschied 

Verbandsgemeinde in Rhineland-Palatinate
Rhein-Lahn-Kreis